Hoodwinked Too! Hood vs. Evil (also known as Hoodwinked 2) is a 2011 3D  computer-animated spy comedy film and the sequel to 2005's Hoodwinked!, directed by Mike Disa in his theatrical feature directorial debut. The film was also written by Disa, Cory Edwards, Todd Edwards and Tony Leech, who wrote and directed the previous Hoodwinked! film. Most of the cast reprised their roles - with Cheech Marin, Tommy Chong, Bill Hader, Amy Poehler, and Joan Cusack joining the cast for the sequel - with the exceptions of Anne Hathaway and Jim Belushi, who were replaced by Hayden Panettiere and Martin Short, respectively.

In the sequel, Red is in training with a mysterious group called the Sisters of the Hood and must team up with Wolf to rescue Hansel and Gretel and Granny from the evil witch, Verushka. The film was released on April 29, 2011 in the United States by The Weinstein Company. Unlike its predecessor, the film received negative reviews from critics and audiences and was a box office bomb.

Plot
Wolf, Granny, and Twitchy are on a rescue mission to save Hansel and Gretel from an evil witch named Verushka. However, the plan goes wrong and Granny is kidnapped as well. Meanwhile, Red is in training with a mysterious group called the Sisters of the Hood, where she learns that a secret, all-powerful truffle recipe has been stolen. She is assigned by detective Nicky Flippers, along with Wolf and Twitchy, to find the recipe and save her grandma.

While getting info at the Giant’s nightclub and interrogating his harp, Red and company learn that an incarcerated Boingo the Bunny has been having specific ingredients sent to Verushka, who was also at the prison and narrowly escapes the team. Red and Wolf argue over who let her get away and the team splits up.
Meanwhile, Verushka, who stole the truffle recipe, tries to force Granny into making it for her. Granny escapes and finds Hansel and Gretel, but learns that they are actually the masterminds behind the plot. Granny is recaptured and finds out that Verushka was an old classmate of hers when they were both in training with the Sisters of the Hood – Verushka was always second best behind Granny’s accomplishments, and eventually grew so jealous of her that she teamed up with Hansel and Gretel to get revenge.

After some convincing by Twitchy, Wolf decides to apologize to Red, but he is encountered by The Three Pigs, who are now part of a pig mercenary group hired by Hansel and Gretel, and barely manages to escape. They make it back to HQ, only to find it abandoned and damaged by Hansel and Gretel’s pig henchmen. On their way to the witch’s lair, Wolf and Twitchy rescue Red, who was caught after trying to sneak in first. The two make up and infiltrate the siblings’ base with help from Kirk the Woodsman and his yodeling troupe. Red accidentally reveals the final ingredient for the truffle recipe – macadamia nuts –, and the truffles are made.

Hansel and Gretel eat the truffles, which transform them into giants to the extent of becoming unstoppable and invincible, and then they go on a rampage through the city. Before they leave, they betray Verushka, leaving her to be eaten by a giant spider with Granny, Red, Wolf, and Twitchy. Granny persuades her to join forces with her and her friends. Soon, they trick Hansel and Gretel into eating more truffles, which makes them obese and immobile in a beach ball-like shape instead of making them more unstoppable and invincible – at some point, the two siblings grow so much that they can no longer move their arms and legs, and they are arrested and condemned to eat broccoli. Nicky recruits the team for another mission.

Voice Cast

 Hayden Panettiere as Red Puckett
 Glenn Close as Abigail "Granny" Puckett
 Patrick Warburton as Wolf W. Wolf
 Joan Cusack as Verushka Van Vine
 Bill Hader as Hansel
 Amy Poehler as Gretel
 Cory Edwards as Twitchy Squirrel
 Cheech Marin as Mad Hog
 Tommy Chong as Stone
 Phil LaMarr as Wood
 David Ogden Stiers as Nicky Flippers (Stiers' final voice acting role in an animated film before his death in 2018)
 Andy Dick as Boingo the Bunny
 Martin Short as Kirk the Woodsman
 Benjy Gaither as Japeth
 Brad Garrett as The Giant
 Wayne Newton as Jimmy 10-Strings
 Debra Wilson as Iana
 David Alan Grier as Moss
 Cameron Barnes as Klaus / Hench Pig #4
 Mike Disa as Lincoln Rogers 1 & 2, Helmut Spider, Rhino, and Agent 1 & 2
 Heidi Klum as Heidi
 Rebecca Andersen as Radio voice
 Danny Pudi as Little Boy Blue
 Frank Welker as Animals' vocal effects (except for the Spider)/Additional Voices
Additional Voices by Kirk Baily, Jack Blessing, Melendy Britt, June Christopher, Brian T. Delaney, Mike Disa, Nicholas Guest, Kyle Herbert, Bridget Hoffman, Sandra Holt, Erin Lander, Wendee Lee, Al Rodrigo, Stephanie Sheh, Keith Silverstein, Marcelo Tubert, Kari Wahlgren, and Lisa Wilhoit.

Production

Development
Hoodwinked! was one of the first fully independently funded computer animated films,
and was produced on a budget of under $8 million,
considerably less than the budget of most studio produced animated films.
The film was directed and written by Cory Edwards, Todd Edwards and Tony Leech, and distributed by The Weinstein Company, which did not sign on until near the end of production.
It was released in December 2005 to mixed reviews, and financial success, earning over $110 million worldwide.
In January 2006, Cory Edwards confirmed that a Hoodwinked! sequel titled Hoodwinked 2: Hood vs. Evil was in the works and that a basic treatment had already been completed. The following month, Edwards announced that he, Todd Edwards, and Tony Leech were writing the sequel, though they would not return to direct.
Cory Edwards cited many reasons for not returning as a director for the sequel. In addition to wanting to focus on other, particularly live-action films, so as not to be confined to animation,
he explained that there had been a tense working relationship between him and some of the "key players on the first film". He also questioned the integrity of the fractured fairytale genre of which Hoodwinked is a part, calling it, "a trend I groaned about even as I finished the film."
Initially, the film was going to be independently funded by Kanbar Entertainment, with the Weinstein Company distributing, as had been done with the previous film; however the two companies entered into a co-financing agreement, at the behest of The Weinstein Company.

In March 2007 it was announced that Mike Disa, who had long worked in the animation industry, would make his directorial debut on the film.
While Disa had not seen the original film before being approached to direct the sequel,
Cory Edwards expressed enthusiasm over his involvement, saying that he "has a real passion for the film and a devotion to maintaining the "Hoodwinked" world. He wants to do the sequel justice and he really gets what we're trying to do". Disa explained in a 2011 column for The Huffington Post that he was impressed by how the gender roles in the film contrasted to those typically portrayed by Disney.

Casting
While most of the cast reprised their roles from the first film, Hayden Panettiere replaced Anne Hathaway in the role of Red, while Martin Short replaced Jim Belushi in the role of Kirk the Woodsman. Cory Edwards explained that the role of Red was recast due to the recent success of Hathaway's career, saying "It's clear to me that her involvement in the first film was a nice favor for Harvey and the last of her "little girl roles."... You can see how a sequel to an animated film is not in her trajectory anymore". Regarding Belushi's departure from the series, Edwards explained, "he was never really comfortable with the accent for the Woodsman. He wanted to help us out and loved the film, but he kept saying, "I'm not an accent guy. So he had a hard time connecting to that character".

Whereas in the first film, the voice of the character Twitchy was created simply by speeding up the recording by 50%, various speeds were used in this film and occasionally the dialogue was only pitched higher without being sped up at all. The difference in Twitchy's voice was immediately noticed by fans after the release of the film's trailer, causing Twitchy's voice actor Cory Edwards to relate that while he had explained to the new filmmakers how the voice was created in the first film and would remark on how the character sounded different when invited to screenings, "from the many blank stares and the end result, nobody really cared".

Director Mike Disa praised Patrick Warburton's reprisal as the Wolf, feeling that he could play subtext, comedy and rhythm while giving real emotion concurrently. He also enjoyed working with Wayne Newton, who voiced Jimmy 10-Strings, for whom Newton took inspiration from the "Mickey and the Beanstalk" segment of Fun and Fancy Free, a Disney package film both Newton and Disa grew up with.

Animation
While the first film's animation was produced by a small group of independent animators in the Philippines,
this film's animation was produced by Canadian animation and visual effects studio Arc Productions instead.
However, like the first film, Maya software was used to create the film's animation. Rendering was done on Mental ray, compositing was done on Fusion, and matte paintings were created on Photoshop. The explosions featured in the film were created using Maya and Houdini.

Director Mike Disa explained that in designing the locations for the film they considered "the idea of a modern fairy tale in modern times" asking themselves, "what would a fairy tale city look like having evolved for hundreds of years? What would their buildings look like, how would they get around" and saying, "We sat down and worked out the technology and mythology of the world of Hoodwinked that they hadn't really established in the first film."

Lawsuit
The film was originally going to be released on January 15, 2010; however, in December 2009, it was announced that the release date would be pushed back to February at the earliest. A Weinstein Company executive stated that some of the reasons were so that the company could focus its resources on promoting Youth in Revolt which would be released January 8 of that year and so that they could perform some tweaks on the film's animation. He also stated that the Weinstein Company was in the final stages of a marketing deal with a fast food chain.

Burger King released toys for the film in January 2010, shortly after the film's initial release date had passed, even though a new release date had not yet been set.

In March 2010, it was revealed that Kanbar Entertainment was suing The Weinstein Company for delaying the film's release, for not making contributions to monthly production accounts after February 2009, and for not consulting them about a release strategy. Kanbar Entertainment also stated that The Weinstein Company did not respond to proposed changes to the film, even though Kanbar Entertainment had final authority on production decisions.

In February 2011 the first trailer and poster for the film were released and a new release date for April 29, 2011 was finally announced.

Soundtracks
Two soundtracks were released for Hoodwinked Too! Hood vs. Evil. The Hoodwinked Too! Hood vs. Evil (Original Motion Picture Soundtrack) featured songs from the film,
while the Hoodwinked Too! Hood vs. Evil (Original Motion Picture Score) featured the film's instrumental tracks composed by Murray Gold.

"Original Motion Picture Soundtrack" Track Listing

"Original Motion Picture Score" Track Listing

Release

Box office
Unlike its predecessor, Hoodwinked Too! Hood vs. Evil was a box office bomb. The film placed number six at the box office for its opening weekend, during which it grossed $4,108,630 across 2,505 theatres, averaging $1,640 per venue. The film fell to number ten in the box office for its second weekend, declining 50.3%, and dropped out of the top ten for its third weekend. This paled in comparison to the first film which opened to $12,401,900, placing number three in the box office for its opening weekend, and ultimately placing in the top ten for a total of five weeks.
Over the course of its theatrical run Hoodwinked Too! Hood vs. Evil took in $10,143,779 at the domestic box office, and $23.1 Mil worldwide,
earning back less than its budget,
and falling short of its predecessor which earned $51,386,611 domestically, and $110,013,167 worldwide.
Hoodwinked Too! Hood vs. Evil followed a pattern of animated sequels released in 2011 financially under performing in comparison to their predecessors.

Critical response

Hoodwinked Too! Hood vs. Evil received very negative reviews. On the review aggregator Rotten Tomatoes, the film has garnered an approval rating of 11% based on 65 reviews, with an average rating of 3.39/10. The website's critical consensus reads, "It may add 3D to the original, but Hoodwinked Too! is missing the first installment's wit and refreshingly low-budget charm." On Metacritic, another review aggregator website, it holds a weighted average score of 20 out of 100, indicating "generally unfavorable reviews".

Claudia Puig of USA Today said that "Hoodwinked Too! Hood vs. Evil is memorable for being one of the most obnoxious animated movies of recent years. If ever there was a movie that should have gone straight to video — or better yet, never have been made — this is it." Roger Moore writing for the Orlando Sentinel gave the film two stars out of four, criticizing the story as "nothing more than a series of martial-arts video-game 'levels' for small children", though praising the voice work of Bill Hader and Amy Poehler whose casting as Hansel and Gretel he considered "inspired". Todd McCarthy of The Hollywood Reporter considered the film to be "one of the most obnoxious and least necessary animated films of the century thus far". Kyle Smith from the New York Post only gave the film half of a star and wrote, "Few were those who demanded a sequel to 2005's "Hoodwinked," and those few should have been ignored. "Hoodwinked Too" doesn't unreel so much as dump on the screen busted fairy-tale characters, dumb would-be jokes, rusty pop-culture references and inert action scenes."

Even many of the critics who enjoyed the first film were disappointed with the sequel. Michael Phillips of the Chicago Tribune gave the film one star and said it "leeches the fun clean out of the first Hoodwinked", and Michael O'Sullivan of The Washington Post wrote that, "while the first film was lifted out of mediocrity by an utterly delightful storyline ... the sequel is a flat, plodding and largely mirthless affair."

In sharp contrast with other reviews, Nell Minow of the Chicago Sun-Times gave Hoodwinked Too! three stars, praising the film's strong heroines and the script, stating "once again what we think we know about fairy-tale heroines, villains, mean girls, old ladies, witches and happy endings are deliciously turned upside down and inside out."

As with the first Hoodwinked film, many reviews were critical of the film's animation. In his review for The New York Times, Andy Webster criticized the film's animation, stating "the images don't remotely approach the nuance of, say, Ice Age, let alone anything from the mack daddy, Pixar. And while it seems there's no getting away from this marketing aesthetic, the resemblance at times to a video game is far, far too acute. The Shrek films — in visual terms — have done this kind of thing better." Michael O'Sullivan of The Washington Post said that the film "suffer[s] from a stylistic stiffness" and called the characters "clunky and ungainly".

In December 2011, Chris Knight of the National Post listed Hoodwinked Too! on his "worst 10 films of 2011".

Cory Edwards, who co-wrote the film, and directed and co-wrote the previous film, expressed disappointment with the final film, insinuating that it would not hold much appeal for anyone older than ten, and saying that it was "deflating to give this thing away and watch others run with it in ways I would not." He also expressed disappointment with major edits that had been made to the original script.
Patrick Warburton has voiced similar sentiments. He has said that the film has less of a "soul" than its predecessor, attributing this problem to the diminished involvement of the Edwards brothers and Tony Leech. "I feel like the original guys got screwed", he said, although he qualified this answer with an acknowledgement that he knows little of the film's behind-the-scenes struggles. Working on the sequel left such a weak impression on him, that only two years after the film's release, he owned to barely even remembering the production process.

Home media
Hoodwinked Too! Hood vs. Evil was released on DVD, Blu-ray, and Blu-ray 3D combo pack on August 16, 2011.

The film never got released theatrically or on physical media in the United Kingdom or Ireland, and did not receive a VOD release there until eleven years later.

Video game
A video game, Red's Escape, was released for iOS on August 16, 2011.

References

External links

 
 
 
 
 

2011 films
2010s English-language films
Films directed by Mike Disa
2010s American animated films
2010s Canadian animated films
2010s buddy comedy films
2010s children's comedy films
2011 3D films
3D animated films
2011 computer-animated films
American buddy comedy films
American children's animated comedy films
American computer-animated films
Canadian animated comedy films
Animated buddy films
Animated films about frogs
Animated films about squirrels
Animated films about wolves
2010s comedy mystery films
American detective films
Fairy tale parody films
Films about witchcraft
Films based on Hansel and Gretel
Films based on Little Red Riding Hood
The Weinstein Company films
The Weinstein Company animated films
Big Bad Wolf
2011 directorial debut films
2011 comedy films
Animated films about friendship
2010s Canadian films